Sasyk-Bulak is a village in the Osh Region of Kyrgyzstan. It is part of the Özgön District. Its population was 565 in 2021.

References

Populated places in Osh Region